Rosell Amado Herrera Navarro (born October 16, 1992) is a Dominican professional baseball outfielder who is a free agent. He has played in Major League Baseball (MLB) for the Cincinnati Reds, Kansas City Royals, and Miami Marlins. He also played in the Chinese Professional Baseball League (CPBL) for the Wei Chuan Dragons.

Career

Colorado Rockies
Herrera was signed by the Colorado Rockies as a non-drafted free agent in 2009.  In 2011, Baseball America named him the fifth-best prospect in the Pioneer League.

A shortstop and occasional third baseman throughout his career, he was switched to the outfield in 2015 while playing his second season in High-A Modesto.
 
Prior to the 2013 season, MLB named him the 12th best prospect in the Rockies system. He was added to the Rockies 40-man roster on November 20, 2013.  Following the 2015 season, Herrera was non-tendered and elected free agency, but re-signed with the Rockies on a minor league deal. He elected free agency on November 6, 2017.

Cincinnati Reds
On November 17, 2017, Herrera signed a minor league contract with the Cincinnati Reds. The Reds promoted him to the major leagues on April 26, 2018. He was designated for assignment on June 1, 2018.

Kansas City Royals
Herrera was claimed off waivers by the Kansas City Royals on June 2, 2018. On June 22, 2018, Herrera would have his most important game thus far, robbing a go-ahead homerun from Alex Bregman in the bottom of the 8th and hitting a go-ahead RBI triple to eventually win the game for the Royals. On July 28, Herrera hit his first Major League home run against David Robertson of the New York Yankees.

Miami Marlins
On January 2, 2019, Herrera was claimed off waivers by the Miami Marlins. Herrera was designated for assignment by the Marlins on June 19. He became a free agent following the 2019 season.

New York Yankees
On January 3, 2020, Herrera signed a minor league deal with the New York Yankees. He became a free agent on November 2, 2020.

Wei Chuan Dragons
On December 26, 2020, Herrera signed with the Wei Chuan Dragons of the Chinese Professional Baseball League. On March 14, 2021, Herrera made his CPBL debut as the Opening Day first baseman against the Uni-President 7-Eleven Lions. He batted .284/.365/.395 with 6 home runs and 37 RBIs in 87 games. On October 24, 2021, Herrera parted ways with the Dragons and became a free agent.

References

External links

1992 births
Living people
Albuquerque Isotopes players
Asheville Tourists players
Casper Ghosts players
Cincinnati Reds players
Dominican Republic expatriate baseball players in Taiwan
Dominican Republic expatriate baseball players in the United States
Dominican Summer League Rockies players
Gigantes del Cibao players
Hartford Yard Goats players
Kansas City Royals players
Louisville Bats players
Major League Baseball outfielders
Major League Baseball players from the Dominican Republic
Miami Marlins players
Modesto Nuts players
New Orleans Baby Cakes players
Omaha Storm Chasers players
Sportspeople from Santo Domingo
Tri-City Dust Devils players
Wei Chuan Dragons players